Pestszentlőrinc‑Pestszentimre (also known as Budapest XVIII. kerülete) is the 18th district of Budapest is situated at the south-eastern part of the city. It is made up of two earlier distinct towns: Pestszentlőrinc and Pestszentimre.

The population of the district today is around 100.000 and this amount is divided between the two divisions as 80%-20%. The area joined Budapest shortly after World War II (see Great-Budapest).

Budapest's international airport (Ferihegy Airport), the Hungarian Meteorological Service and the Central Atmospheric Institute are located here.

List of mayors

Twin towns - twin cities
Pestszentlőrinc-Pestszentimre is twinned with:
  Băile Tușnad – Romania
  Dąbrowa Tarnowska – Poland
  Artashat – Armenia
  Nin – Croatia
  San Nicola la Strada – Italy
  Nesebar – Bulgaria
  Roding – Germany
  Obzor – Bulgaria
  Izvoru Crișului – Romania
  Moldava nad Bodvou – Slovakia
  Tiachiv – Ukraine
  Odorheiu Secuiesc – Romania

Gallery

References

External links 
 Official site (Hungarian)
 Aerial photographs of Pestszentlőrinc